Toualy is an Ivorian surname. Notable people with this surname include:

 Jean Marco Toualy (born 1999), Ivorian footballer
 Likane Julie Toualy (born 1976), Ivorian handball player
 Sery Toualy (born 1986), Ivorian handball player

Surnames of African origin